The Class 59 is a diesel locomotive of the National Railway Company of Belgium. 

The locomotive features dual-ended operation with end-of-train red marker lights. The hood features cantilever doors. In the mid-1960s, they were given a green livery with yellow stripes and additional steps were added under the lights. These locomotives were used on both secondary lines where electrification was not profitable and on the main lines, until they were finally equipped with a catenary. At the end of 1953, NMBS/SNCB ordered 55 of these four axle locomotives (originally called Type 201) which were to be assembled at the John Cockerill factories in Seraing, each equipped with a Baldwin engine. They were first used on light lines of the northern plains of Sambre and the Meuse. The first units the series were delivered in December 1954. They were still being used in June 2002 to haul work trains building the high speed rail lines in France and Belgium.

Preservation

References 

National Railway Company of Belgium locomotives
Diesel-electric locomotives of Belgium
Standard gauge locomotives of Belgium